Sarah Elizabeth Bierce (1838–1898) was an American journalist and educator who was a charter member of the Woman's Press Club of Cleveland.

Early years and education
She was born Sarah Elizabeth Holden in Sweden, Maine, she attended primary school in New England later moving to Michigan and graduating from Kalamazoo College in 1860.

Career
After graduating from college, for six years she taught in both public and private schools. While engaged in school work, she wrote numerous plays, which were first used at entertainments given by her pupils and afterwards published. From the time of her marriage, in 1866, to her husband's death, in 1881, Bierce wrote little for the press.

In 1885, she accepted a permanent position in connection with the Cleveland Plain Dealer, contributing stories, sketches and special articles to the Sunday issue. Her stories and sketches of home life and pioneer incidents were especially popular. While most inclined to fiction, she wrote numerous letters of travel. Her descriptions of life and scenery in California, Arizona, Nevada and Utah were unusually entertaining.

She gave much time to the investigation of certain phases of the working-woman problem, and has also written special articles on art subjects. She was a member of the Ohio Woman's Press Association and in 1892, was corresponding secretary of that body. In 1891, she was chosen delegate to the International League of Press Clubs, formed in Pittsburgh, Pennsylvania.

Bierce managed the women's literary and journalistic department of the Ohio Centennial, held in Columbus in 1888.

She died in October 1898 and is buried at Lake View Cemetery.

References

 Frances Elizabeth Willard and Mary Ashton Rice Livermore, "Sarah Elizabeth Bierce", Woman of the Century, 1893, Charles Wells Moulton

External links
 

1838 births
People from Oxford County, Maine
American women journalists
Kalamazoo College alumni
Journalists from Maine
1898 deaths
Wikipedia articles incorporating text from A Woman of the Century